Sarah Stevenson (born 1983) is a British taekwondo athlete.

Sarah Stevenson may also refer to:
Sarah Clotworthy Stevenson (1824–1885) former First Lady of Virginia
Sarah Hackett Stevenson (1841–1909), American physician

See also
Sara Yorke Stevenson (1847–1921), American archaeologist